Green Alternative (GA; ; Zelyonaya al'ternativa, ZA) is a green political party in Russia. It was established in March 2020.

Green Alternative does not exclusively associate itself with the environmental movement, calling itself a "moderate left-wing environmental party of the European type".

History
Green Alternative was created as a social movement in December 2019 by environmental activist and former Mestnye member Ruslan Khvostov.

In February 2020, documents for registration of a political party were submitted to the Ministry of Justice.

On 10 March 2020, the founding congress of the Green Alternative was held, where Ruslan Khvostov was elected party leader, gaining almost 80% of the vote. In addition, the famous artist  was elected informal leader of the party.

On 7 April 2020, the party was officially registered by the Ministry of Justice and in May received the right to participate in the elections.

The party participated in the 2020 regional elections, gaining 10% of the vote in the Komi Republic and 5.4% in the Chelyabinsk region. Since the party won seats in regional parliaments, it has the right to participate in Federal parliamentary elections without collecting signatures.

In the 2021 legislative elections, Green Alternative came twelfth, winning 0.64% of the popular vote and no seats.

Election results

State Duma elections

References

External links
 Official website

Registered political parties in Russia
Political parties established in 2020
2020 establishments in Russia
Green political parties in Russia
Pro-European political parties in Russia